Elisa Balsamo can refer to:

 Elisa Balsamo (cyclist) (born 1998), Italian road and track cyclist
 Elisa Balsamo (tennis) (born 1983), Italian tennis player